Gymnastics competitions at the 2022 Bolivarian Games in Valledupar, Colombia are being held from 27 June to 3 July 2022 at Coliseo de Ferias and Coliseo of Popular University of Cesar.

Twenty five medal events are scheduled to be contested; 14 in artistic gymnastics (eight for men, six for women), eight in rhythmic (all for women) and 3 in trampoline (one for men, two for women). A total of 119 athletes will compete in the events. The events were open competitions without age restrictions, except for the artistics where gymnasts must be at least 18 (men) and 16 (women) years old by 31 December 2022.

It was planned that a men's synchronized trampolining event would be held, but finally did not take place.

Colombia are the gymnastics competitions defending champions having won them in the previous edition in Santa Marta 2017.

Participating nations
All 11 participating nations at the games (7 ODEBO nations and 4 invited) registered athletes for the gymnastics competitions. Each nation was able to enter a maximum of 28 gymnasts (9 men and 19 women) distributed by disciplines as follows:

Artistic gymnastics: a team conformed by a maximun of 6 and minimum of 4 gymnasts per gender (a maximun total of 12), or otherwise, a maximum of three gymnasts who would participate as individuals.
Rhythmic gymnastics: a minimum of 1 and maximun of 10 athletes (all for women).
Trampoline: up to 6 gymnasts (3 per gender)

Venues
The gymnastics competitions were held in two venues, both in Valledupar. Artistic gymnastics was held at Coliseo de Ferias Luis Alberto Monsalvo Ramírez located south of Valledupar. Rhythmic gimnastics and trampoline disciplines will be held at Coliseo of Popular University of Cesar, the venue that was also going to host the artistic gymnastics before it was moved to the Coliseo de Ferias.

Medal summary

Medal table

Medalists

Artistic gymnastics

Men's events

Women's events

Rhythmic gymnastics

Individual

Group

Trampoline

References

External links
Bolivarianos Valledupar 2022 Artistic gymnastics
Bolivarianos Valledupar 2022 Rhythmic gymnastics
Bolivarianos Valledupar 2022 Trampoline

2022 Bolivarian Games
2022 in gymnastics
International gymnastics competitions hosted by Colombia